Amanda Joy Radnage (born 27 September 1951) is a female retired British international swimmer.

Swimming career
She competed in the women's 200 metre breaststroke at the 1972 Summer Olympics.

She represented England and won a bronze medal in the 200 metres breaststroke, at the 1970 British Commonwealth Games in Edinburgh, Scotland. At the ASA National British Championships she won the 110 yards breaststroke title in 1967 and 1970.

References

External links
 

1951 births
Living people
British female swimmers
Olympic swimmers of Great Britain
Swimmers at the 1972 Summer Olympics
Swimmers at the 1970 British Commonwealth Games
Commonwealth Games medallists in swimming
Commonwealth Games bronze medallists for England
Medallists at the 1970 British Commonwealth Games